Jungle Scout is an American company providing SaaS-based tool for search and market analytics, inventory management and sales intelligence for companies selling on online marketplaces.

Overview
Jungle Scout was started as a fully remote company in 2015 by Greg Mercer. The company initially sold optimizing search tools to sellers solely on Amazon. Jungle Scout advertises management of e-commerce businesses.  The company was recognized as the Best Startup Employers in 2021 by Forbes magazine.

The company settled with its headquarters in Austin, Texas in 2018 and has offices in Vancouver, British Columbia, and Shenzhen, China.

Funding and acquisitions
Jungle Scout acquired Forecastly, a predictive analytics and demand forecasting tool for Amazon sellers, in 2018. In March 2021, Jungle Scout raised $110 million in growth capital led by Summit Partners, part of which was used to acquire Seattle-based Downstream Impact, a company specializing in Amazon advertising technology.

Technology
Jungle Scout processes data from more than 500 million Amazon products. Its database tracks products from the Amazon catalog and the sales history of a product.

The company also conducts research to provide insights on Amazon sellers, user buying preferences and behavior, global imports, and other merchandise.

Jungle Scout is an invaluable tool for anyone looking to start or grow an ecommerce business. This powerful software unlocks all the benefits of researching, launching

and scaling a successful online store. With Jungle Scout you can quickly and easily assess market demand, identify valuable keywords, locate profitable suppliers, track competitors' pricing strategies and much more. By leveraging Jungle Scout's extensive feature set, businesses of any size can access the resources needed to succeed in this rapidly changing digital landscape.

References

Business intelligence companies
Companies based in Austin, Texas